The 2018 Bulgaria Open was the ninth event of the 2018 ITTF World Tour. The event was organised by the Bulgarian Table Tennis Federation, under the authority of the International Table Tennis Federation (ITTF). It took place from 16–19 August in Panagyurishte, Bulgaria.

Men's singles

Seeds

Draw

Top half

Bottom half

Finals

Women's singles

Seeds

Draw

Top half

Bottom half

Finals

Men's doubles

Seeds

Draw

Women's doubles

Seeds

Draw

References

External links

Tournament page on ITTF website

Bulgaria Open
Bulgaria Open (table tennis)
Table tennis competitions in Bulgaria
International sports competitions hosted by Bulgaria
Bulgaria Open (table tennis)